Grammelot (or gromalot or galimatias)  is an imitation of language used in satirical theatre, an ad hoc gibberish that uses prosody along with macaronic and onomatopoeic elements to convey emotional and other meaning,  and used in association with mime and mimicry. The satirical use of such a format may date back to the 16th century commedia dell'arte; the group of cognate terms appears to belong to the 20th century.

History

In an essay entitled “L’art du grommelot”, French scholar Claude Duneton suggests the word (not the technique) – in its French form, grommelot – has its origins in the commedia dell'arte-derived Italian theatre of the early part of the sixteenth century. Duneton studied briefly with Léon Chancerel (1886–1965), who was a major figure in this branch of theatre. Chancerel in fact uses the word in his book, Le théâtre et la jeunesse (Paris: Bourrellier 1946:47). Others, such as theatre scholar John Rudlin in Commedia dell'arte: An Actor's Handbook (London: Routledge 1994:60), suggest this origin as well.

While the historical origin of the term is unclear, it has been particularly popularized by the Nobel-winning Italian playwright Dario Fo. His 1969 show Mistero Buffo ("Comic Mystery Play") was a satirical touring performance involving sketches based on mediaeval sources, told in Fo's own grammelots constructed from Gallo-Italian languages and phonemes from modern languages (he has coined separate Italian, French and American grammelots). In his Nobel lecture, Fo referred to the 16th-century Italian playwright Ruzzante's invention of a similar language based on Italian dialects, Latin, Spanish, German and onomatopoeic sounds.

Another notable modern Italian exponent is the Milan actor/writer Gianni Ferrario. Voice actor Carlo Bonomi, also from Milan, used grammelot to voice Osvaldo Cavandoli's cartoon La Linea and many years later, outside Italy, Otmar Gutmann's Pingu. Mainstream comics have also used Grammelot-like language: for instance, Stanley Unwin. The Canadian circus and entertainment troupe Cirque du Soleil uses in its routines similar forms of language; journalists often term them "Cirquish", but Cirque du Soleil's own staff use the word "Grommelot".

Famous Grammelot are also Charles Chaplin's imitation of Hitler in The Great Dictator, and Monty Python's Flying Sheep.

See also
 Asemic writing
 Double-talk
 La Linea (TV series)
 Molang
 Pingu
 Simlish

References

External links
Language Log: all mentions of "Grammelot"
Language Log: discussion of the mistaken attribution to Fo
Dario Fo performing the grammelot of different emotions
 A short glossary of Grammelot phrases as used by "Alex the Jester"

Theatre
Gibberish language
Language games
Macaronic language